Walter William Marbet (September 13, 1890 – September 24, 1956) was a Major League Baseball pitcher who played with the St. Louis Cardinals in  .

External links

1890 births
1956 deaths
Major League Baseball pitchers
Baseball players from Iowa
St. Louis Cardinals players
Paducah Chiefs players
People from Plymouth County, Iowa
People from Hohenwald, Tennessee